Flight of the Conchords: Live in London is a 2018 stand-up comedy and music special by Flight of the Conchords. The special was recorded live in July 2018 at the Eventim Apollo in London, and released by HBO on October 6, 2018. The special was released as a double album as Live in London by Sub Pop in March 2019.

Outside of sets on shows like Just for Laughs and One Night Stand, recorded in 2004 and 2005 respectively, Live in London is the duo's first comedy special. The album release was their fifth overall, and fourth that was widely distributed.

Background and release 
Flight of the Conchords launched a sold-out tour of the United Kingdom and Ireland in March 2018 titled Flight of the Conchords Sing Flight of the Conchords Tour; many of the dates were rescheduled to June–July 2018 following Bret McKenzie breaking his hand mid-tour. The reunion tour featured a sixteen song set which was a mix of their classics, songs from their television show, and six new songs.

Flight of the Conchords played four nights at the end of the tour at the Eventim Apollo in London during which they recorded their performances with director Hamish Hamilton for HBO. The special premiered on HBO in October 2018. Ahead of the premiere, they performed the song "Father and Son" on The Late Show with Stephen Colbert.

The duo said that they were interested in producing their first full-length comedy special to capture the essence of their live show, with McKenzie explaining, "I like the idea of capturing what we do live, because it doesn’t really exist on tape. We’ve spent so many years touring, but we’re more well known for the TV show, which is actually quite different from what we really do." They have indicated that this would likely be their only Flight of the Conchords project of this scope for some time.

Album 

The album version of the special, titled Live in London, on March 8, 2019. It was released as a double album by Sub Pop, their fourth release with the label and their first in ten years. The album premiered in the United States in February on NPR's First Listen.

Live in London album features six new songs by the band, “Iain and Deanna”, “Father and Son”, “Summer of 1353”, “Stana”, “Seagull”, and “Back on the Road”, as well as the first album version of “Bus Driver.” Additionally, the release includes versions of “Carol Brown” and “The Most Beautiful Girl (In The Room)" which were edited out of the HBO special due to time constraints.

Track listing 
Credits adapted from the album's liner notes.

Personnel 
Musicians

 Bret McKenzie – vocals, guitar, bass guitar, piano, recorder, percussion
 Jemaine Clement – vocals, guitar, bass guitar, synthesizer, flute, percussion
 Nigel Collins – cello, bass guitar, vocals

Production

 Mickey Petralia – producer, mixing engineer
 Mike Leach – FOH engineer
 Matt Shane – monitor engineer, backline

Management & Art

 Bret McKenzie – art direction
 Jemaine Clement – art direction
 Sasha Barr – art direction
 Jennifer McCord – photography
 Rebecca Travis – tour manager
 Marc Janowitz – production manager, lighting designer
 Red Light Management (Eric Mayers, Jay Barnings, Mike Martinovich, Olivia Harrington) – management
 Mark Kaplan – business management
 Doug Mark – legal
 Jeff Endlich – legal
 Hamish Hamilton – other contributions
 James Merryman – other contributions
 Jim Parsons – other contributions
 Rachel French – other contributions
 Simon Pizey – other contributions

External links 

 
 
 Live in London on HBO

References 

Flight of the Conchords albums
2010s comedy albums
2019 live albums
2018 comedy films
2018 films
2018 television films